Heinrich Bebel (1472 in Ingstetten (now part of Schelklingen) – 1518 Tübingen) was a German humanist.

Biography
He was an alumnus of Krakow and Basel universities, and from 1497 professor of poetry and rhetoric at the University of Tübingen. His fame rests principally on his Facetiae (1506), a curious collection of bits of homely and rather coarse-grained humor and anecdote, directed mainly against the clergy; on Proverbia Germanica (1508; new ed., Leyden, 1879); and on his Triumph of Venus, a keen satire on the depravity of his time.  He was a friend of Erasmus.

Notes

References
 
 

1472 births
1518 deaths
People from Alb-Donau-Kreis
German male writers
German Renaissance humanists
Writers from Baden-Württemberg
Academic staff of the University of Tübingen